The 2021 Spielberg Formula 3 round was the third round of the 2021 FIA Formula 3 Championship. It took place at the Red Bull Ring and featured three races in support of the 2021 Austrian Grand Prix from July 2nd to 4th.

Classification

Qualifying 
Caio Collet initially set the fasted lap, but was soon deleted giving Dennis Hauger pole for race 3, and Logan Sargeant received pole for race 1.

 Notes

  – Roman Staněk was penalized after the session for impeding Lorenzo Colombo.

Sprint Race 1

Sprint Race 2

Feature Race 

Note:

 - Kaylen Frederick was declared unfit for the Feature Race due to a broken wrist sustained in the second Sprint Race after a collision with fellow compatriot Juan Manuel Correa.

Standings after the event 

Drivers' Championship standings

Teams' Championship standings

 Note: Only the top five positions are included for both sets of standings.

See also 

 2021 Austrian Grand Prix

References 

|- style="text-align:center"
|width="35%"|Previous race:
|width="30%"|FIA Formula 3 Championship2021 season
|width="40%"|Next race:

2021 FIA Formula 3 Championship
Spielberg Formula 3
Spielberg Formula 3 round